East Grand Rapids Public Schools is a school district located within East Grand Rapids, Michigan. Founded in 1841, the district limits mirror the city limits except for a small grouping of homes north of the city.

Overview 
The East Grand Rapids Public School system consists of one secondary school, one intermediate school, and three primary schools:

East Grand Rapids High School
East Grand Rapids Middle School
Breton Downs Elementary School
Lakeside Elementary School
Wealthy Elementary School

The district also included two other schools—Manhattan Elementary School (razed, site now part of Manhattan Park) and Woodcliff Elementary School (now houses the Morse Administration Center). The administration center is named after former superintendent Dr. James Morse.

The current superintendent of East Grand Rapids public schools is Dr. Heidi Kattula, who began her tenure in the fall of 2018.

Athletics 

East Grand Rapids' school colors are blue and gold, and their mascot is Paul the Pioneer.  The school fight song is Onward East to the tune of On Wisconsin.

References

External links

Education in Kent County, Michigan
School districts in Michigan
1841 establishments in Michigan
East Grand Rapids, Michigan